Mangifera pentandra is a species of plant in the family Anacardiaceae. It is found in Malaysia, Singapore, and possibly Thailand.

References

pentandra
Trees of Malaya
Trees of Borneo
Vulnerable plants
Taxonomy articles created by Polbot